Nacoleia leucographalis is a moth in the family Crambidae. It was described by George Hampson in 1912. It is found in Sierra Leone.

References

Moths described in 1912
Taxa named by George Hampson
Nacoleia
Moths of Africa